Alex Scott may refer to:

Sportspeople

Association football
Alex Scott (footballer, 1913–1962), English football goalkeeper who played for Wolverhampton Wanderers and Crewe Alexandra.
Alex Scott (footballer, 1936–2001), Scottish football winger who played for Rangers and Everton.
Alex Scott (footballer, born 1984), English women's international footballer, and television pundit, who played for Arsenal.
Alex Scott (footballer, born 2003), English football midfielder who plays for Bristol City.

Other sports
Alex Scott (racehorse trainer) (1960–1994), British racehorse trainer murdered in 1994
Alex Scott (cricketer) (born 1990), Hong Kong cricketer

Other people
Alex Scott (actor) (1929–2015), Australian-British actor who starred in shows such as The Saint and Randall & Hopkirk
Alex Scott (1996–2004), founder of Alex's Lemonade Stand Foundation, a nationwide U.S. charity to raise funds for pediatric cancer research
Alex Scott (politician) (born 1940), Bermudian politician who served as Premier, 2003–2006

See also
Alexander Scott (disambiguation)
Alec Scott (1906–1978), British horse rider 
Aleck Scott, a steamer renamed USS Lafayette